In music, flat (Italian bemolle for "soft B") means "lower in pitch". Flat is the opposite of sharp, which is a raising of pitch. In musical notation, flat means "lower in pitch by one semitone (half step)", notated using the symbol  which is derived from a stylised lowercase 'b'. For instance, the music below has a key signature with three flats (indicating either E major or C minor) and the note, D, has a flat accidental.

 

Under twelve-tone equal temperament, D for instance is enharmonically equivalent to C, and G is equivalent to F. In any other tuning system, such enharmonic equivalences in general do not exist. To allow extended just intonation, composer Ben Johnston uses a sharp as an accidental to indicate a note is raised 70.6 cents (ratio 25:24), and a flat to indicate a note is lowered 70.6 cents.

In intonation, flat can also be used as an adjective to mean "slightly lower in pitch" (by some unspecified amount). If two simultaneous notes are slightly out-of-tune, the lower-pitched one (assuming the higher one is properly pitched) is "flat" with respect to the other. Furthermore, the verb flatten means to lower the pitch of a note, typically by a small musical interval.

Key signatures 
Flats are used in the key signatures of
 F major / D minor (B)
 B major / G minor (adds E)
 E major / C minor (adds A)
 A major / F minor (adds D)
 D major / B minor (adds G)
 G major / E minor (adds C)
 C major / A minor (adds F)
The order of flats in the key signatures of music notation, following the circle of fifths, is B, E, A, D, G, C and F (mnemonics for which include Battle Ends And Down Goes Charles' Father and Before Eating A Doughnut Get Coffee First). Some people choose to remember the order of flats simply with BEAD GCF (read: bead jee see eff)

Related symbols 
Double flats also exist, which look like  (similar to two flats) and lower a note by two semitones, or a whole step. Historically, in order to raise a double flat to a single flat, it was required to use the notation . In modern scores it is acceptable to simply denote this with a regular single flat .

A quarter-tone flat, half flat, or demiflat indicating the use of quarter tones, may be marked with various symbols including a flat with a slash or a reversed flat sign. A three-quarter-tone flat, flat and a half or sesquiflat, is represented by a demiflat and a regular flat.

Although very uncommon, a triple flat can sometimes be found. It lowers a note three semitones, or a whole tone and a semitone.

Unicode
The Unicode character ♭ (U+266D) can be found in the block Miscellaneous Symbols; its HTML entity is &#9837;. Other assigned flat signs are as follows:

See also 
 Sharp (music)
 Electronic tuner

References

External links
 

Musical notation
Pitch (music)